The 2019 MENA Tour was the eighth season of the MENA Tour and featured 10 events, all held in the MENA area. The tour was not held in 2018.

Josh Hill made history at the Al Ain Open as the youngest player to win an OWGR-recognized event, breaking the record of Ryo Ishikawa.

Schedule
The following table lists official events during the 2019 season.

Order of Merit
The Order of Merit was titled as the Journey to Jordan and was based on prize money won during the season, calculated using a points-based system. Josh Hill led the amateur Order of Merit.

Notes

References

MENA Tour